Jomo Kenyatta International Airport , is an international airport serving Nairobi, the capital and largest city of Kenya. The other three important international airports in Kenya include Kisumu International Airport, Moi International Airport and Eldoret International Airport. Originally named Embakasi Airport, the airport's name was changed in 1978 after Jomo Kenyatta, Kenya's first President and Prime Minister. The airport served over 7 million passengers in 2016, making it the seventh busiest airport in passenger traffic on the continent.

The postal code for Jomo Kenyatta International Airport (JKIA) is 00501

History

1950s and 1960s

Discussions about building the airport date back to 1945. At that time, the colonial power—Britain—and its national airline, BOAC, were worried that the existing airport at Eastleigh was inadequate for post-War civilian airliners. The costs of improving Eastleigh versus developing a new airport occupied planners for 8 years. Who would pay was a major issue.

Plans for the airport were drawn up in 1953, work started in January 1954, and by mid-1957 it was found possible to bring the operational date forward to mid-March 1958. The task was by no means straightforward, and many problems —largely of a civil engineering nature—had to be overcome before the runway could be built. An extensive amount of the airport's construction was done utilizing forced labor, many of whom were Mau Mau rebels. Due to the enormous pressure to finish the airport and the high amount of labor necessary, it was not uncommon to work the laborers to the point where some of them died of exhaustion. The working conditions were so poor that were reports of suicides and self-mutilation among the laborers. The site chosen, on a great lava plain, is a pilot's and a controller's dream:  from the centre of Nairobi (the city's two other airports, Eastleigh and Wilson, are closer), its approaches are free from any obstruction for at least  in any direction.

On Sunday 9 March 1958, Embakasi Airport (now JKIA) was opened by the last colonial governor of Kenya, Sir Evelyn Baring. The airport was due to be opened by Queen Elizabeth The Queen Mother; however, she was delayed in Australia due to an engine failure on her Qantas Lockheed Super Constellation aircraft. Due to this, the Queen was unable to attend the ceremony.

The  runway at the then Embakasi Airport was a big improvement on Eastleigh's  murram runway, which in the rainy months was unsuitable for Britannias. The 06 approach was used on 90 per cent of the time. There were  shoulders each side; and consequently  run-offs beyond the shoulders. After cambering, weak spots were reset, and finally paving machinery was used to lay the asphalt surface. The result was an engineering success of which the contractors were very proud; so accurate was the cambering that the wet surface of the runway dried out evenly on each side of the centre-line. Physically, the great care taken in the engineering resulted in a load classification number of 100 being achieved. The surface at the time was strong enough to accept the Boeing 707 at maximum gross weight, although  rather than  length was the probable all-weather length requirement. There was no physical limit to extending the paved length to this figure, but more definite plans for the operation of the big jets into Kenya was required before such an increase was contemplated.

At the time in 1958, Nairobi was one of the few towns in the world that could boast of a 1965 airport with an expansion option at hand. The number of aircraft movements then was less than 600 per month. The airport architect was strongly influenced by the design of Kloten, Zurich, in the planning and design of Embakasi, although similarities were by no means obvious. Both airports are arranged so that arrival passengers can see completely through the building; the minimum of signs is required. And although Embakasi was designed to meet Nairobi's particular needs, both airports shared a lightness and spaciousness that was at the time extraordinarily refreshing. The fitting and colour schemes employed at the then Embakasi Airport were first-class.

1970s, 1980s and 1990s

In 1972, the World Bank approved funds for further expansion of the airport, including a new international and domestic passenger terminal building, the airport's first dedicated cargo and freight terminal, new taxiways, associated aprons, internal roads, car parks, police and fire stations, a State Pavilion, airfield and roadway lighting, fire hydrant system, water, electrical, telecommunications and sewage systems, a dual carriageway passenger access road, security, drainage and the building of the main access road to the airport (Airport South Road). The total cost of the project was over US$29 million (US$111.8 million in 2013 dollars). On 14 March 1978, construction of the current terminal building was completed on the other side of the airport's single runway and opened by President Kenyatta. The airport was again renamed, this time in honour of President Kenyatta after his death about five months later on 22 August 1978.

In October 1993, a British Airways Concorde landed at the airport for purposes of testing the aircraft's performance at high altitude.

2000–present
On 10 June 2008, Kenya Vision 2030 was launched by President Mwai Kibaki. Under the vision, JKIA's aging infrastructure was to be upgraded to World Class standards. New terminals and runway upgrades were to be added in phases. The African Development Bank carried out an Environmental Impact Assessment on the development of Phase 1 of the proposed Green Field Terminal (GFT) which was expected to increase the capacity of JKIA to about 18.5 million passengers annually by the year 2030. The Greenfield Terminal project was to encompass the construction of a four level terminal building comprising a central processing area, a transit hotel, landside retail centers, arrivals and departures plaza. Ancillary facilities which would have included an access road, car parking, access taxiways, Ground Service Equipment (GSE) and bus parking areas.

On 29 March 2016, the KES 56 billion (US$560 Million) Greenfield Terminal Project was terminated by Kenya Airports Authority because the contractor failed to secure funds thus ending Kenya's vision of having the largest terminal in Africa.

In February 2017, the airport was awarded a Category One Status by the Federal Aviation Administration of the United States, thus allowing possible direct flights between the US and Nairobi. Five other African countries have direct flights to the US (South Africa, Ethiopia, Egypt, Morocco, and Cabo Verde).

2013 fire

On 7 August 2013, a fire originating in the immigration area caused massive damage to the airport and forced it to suspend operations temporarily. Unit 3, usually dedicated to domestic operations, was used temporarily for international traffic. The worst fire in the airport's history occurred on the fifteenth anniversary of the 1998 United States embassy bombings in Nairobi and Dar es Salaam, but no connection was immediately obvious and no terrorist group has claimed responsibility. The cause is not believed to be intentional, as no explosive devices were discovered during the initial investigation. According to Kenyan officials, firefighting efforts were hampered by some of the first responders choosing to loot the airport instead of fighting the blaze. International arrivals had been bused to a temporary facility set up in the ground floor of the new parkade until the reconstruction of the damaged areas. In June 2015, a new, fully functional temporary terminal building became operational. This terminal building was planned for a design life of 10 years, until completion of the planned new permanent facility.

Facilities

Terminals

There are two terminals. Terminal 1 is arranged in a semi-circular orientation and is divided into four parts: 1A, 1B, 1C, and 1E are used for international arrivals and departures while terminal 1D is used for domestic departures and arrivals. Terminal 2 is used by low-cost carriers. The original terminal, located on the north side of the runway, is used by the Kenya Air Force and is sometimes referred as Old Embakasi Airport.

Figures from KAA indicate that the airport's Terminal 1-A has a capacity of 2.5 million passengers  The Kenyan government is targeting over 25 million passengers annually by 2025 on the expansion of JKIA's terminals. In 2016, JKIA accounted for more than 70 per cent of overall passenger traffic in the country. It also had over 7 million passengers pass through it. Domestic travellers through the Jomo Kenyatta International Airport (JKIA) made up 40% cent of overall passengers in 2016. This is an increase from 32% five years prior (2012).

Terminal 1A International Departures and Arrivals
Terminal 1A has a capacity of 2.5 million passengers a year and 3 levels, 30 check-in counters, 12 departure gates, ample seating and food & retail options. The Arrivals area houses 5 baggage carousels. This terminal is used primarily by Skyteam member airlines.

Terminal 1B International Departures
Terminal 1B houses common-use check-in counters, with security check points leading to the departure lounge on level 1. On level one is the Aspire lounge as well as duty-free shopping outlets and cafe's

Terminal 1C International Departures
This terminal houses common-use check-in counters, with security check points leading to the departure lounge on level 1. On level 1 are duty-free shops, Kenya Airways Simba Lounge and the Turkish Airlines Lounge and a cafe.

Terminal 1D Domestic Flights
Serves departing and arriving passengers on domestic flights. Occupied only Kenya Airways and its subsidiary, Jambojet.

Terminal 1E International Arrivals
Following the closure of the main International Arrivals and Departures terminal after a fire, a parking facility was converted into the temporary International Arrivals terminal.

This terminal was subsequently opened to serve arriving passengers on airlines operating out of Terminals 1B and 1C.

NOTE: Remodeling & extending Terminals 1B, 1C & 1D is scheduled for 2017, after which JKIA is predicted to be able to handle 12M passengers.

Terminal 2 Low-cost Carriers
Serves mainly low-cost carrier airlines (LCCs). The prefabricated terminal opened in April 2015 with a capacity of 2.5M passengers - originally intended to relieve overcrowding. Terminal 2 houses international & domestic check-in desks and boarding gates. Current lounges at Terminal 2 include the Mara Lounge and Mount Kenya Lounge - both at airside, Level 1 and open 24 hours.

Lounges
In January 2015, The Simba Lounge and Pride Lounge which are situated on the second floor of Terminal 1A were opened. The two facilities, with a combined capacity of 350 people, were developed at a cost of KES 135 million ($1.35 Million), and are for the use of KQ's Premier World and SkyTeam's Sky Priority passengers. There is also a Turkish Airlines TAV Lounge (T1B), as well as the Swissport Aspire Lounge (T1C). Both are regular lounges, which can be accessed by elite status or a paid-pass.

Second runway
In January 2017, a new instrument landing system-equipped runway  in length was approved for construction at a cost of KES 37 Billion shillings (approximately US$370 million). According to KAA's managing director John Anderson, construction of the new runway which will be bigger than the existing one will begin this year (2017). It will also double aircraft movement from 25 to 45 per hour. The new runway will be a category 2 runway and will complement the older runway built in the 1970s. This is an ICAO code F which can handle the new generation wide bodied aircraft like the Airbus A380 and the Boeing 747-8. The new runway will have fog lights, currently the present runway is only lit at the sides. The runway will also enable long haul flights to destinations like New York city carrying up to 32 tonnes of passengers and cargo.

Airlines and destinations

Passenger

Cargo

Other facilities
 Amaica, a restaurant offering authentic Kenyan and African cuisine has its store in Terminal 1A Level 2.
 American fast food chain Hardee's has an outlet at JKIA Terminal 1-A.
 African Express Airways has its head office on the airport property.
 The Kenya Airports Authority also has its head office at the airport.

Statistics

Ground transport
The main entrance to Jomo Kenyatta International Airport is on Airport South Road, which can be accessed by an exit from the A109 highway (Mombasa Road).As well as the new 2022 expressway which can connect you to the airport with no turns or traffic from the city.

Passengers can also travel to and from the airport via city Bus Route Number 34.

Taxi and Car rental services are well represented.

A link to the Nairobi Commuter Rail network has been proposed.

Accidents and incidents

 On 20 November 1974, Lufthansa Flight 540, a Lufthansa Boeing 747-130, D-ABYB, LH 540, "Hessen" (German state), delivered 1970, crashed on takeoff from runway 24 in Nairobi killing 59 of the 157 on board. The aircraft was on a flight from Frankfurt to Nairobi then Johannesburg. This was the first fatal accident and third hull loss of a Boeing 747.
 On 17 May 1989, a Boeing 707-330B operated by Somali Airlines aborted takeoff and then overran the wet runway and crashed into a rice field. The plane had 70 passengers and crew on board, but no fatalities resulted. The airplane was damaged beyond repair.
 On 4 December 1990, a Boeing 707-321C freighter operated by Sudania Air Cargo struck an electricity pole  short of runway 06 and crashed in flames. All 10 persons on board died. The airplane was damaged beyond repair.
 On 6 June 2012, EgyptAir Flight 849, an Airbus A320, blew a tire while landing and veered off runway 06. Portions of the aircraft obstructed the runway, necessitating closure of the airport. Inbound flights were diverted to other airports in Kenya, Uganda and Tanzania. None of the 123 passengers and crew was injured.
 On 2 July 2014, a Fokker 50 crashed after takeoff due to a mechanical failure, killing all four people on board.
 On 4 January 2015, a Fokker 50 carrying 6 people crashed after a landing gear failure. Of the 6 on board, no injuries were reported. Jomo Kenyatta Airport was temporarily closed and all flights were diverted to Moi International Airport, Mombasa.

References

External links 

 Kenya Airports Authority – Jomo Kenyatta International Airport
 
 

Airport
Airports in Kenya
Airports established in 1958
Airport